The National-Report is the Colombian music industry standard singles popularity chart tracking company. Chart rankings are based on radio play and issued weekly. The data are compiled by monitoring radio stations through an automated system in real-time. National-Report also monitors data from Venezuela and Ecuador. The company provides the Top 100 Nacional, with only the first 20 positions released to the public, and the rest of the chart only available for subscribers.

Records, milestones and achievements
This is a listing of significant achievements and milestones based upon the National-Report Top 100 Nacional.

Song achievements

Most weeks at number one
19 weeks
Carlos Vives ft Shakira — "La Bicicleta" (2016)

18 weeks
ChocQuibTown — "Cuando te veo" (2015)

16 weeks
Carlos Vives — "Volví a Nacer" (2012–13)

15 weeks
Maluma — "Borró Cassette" (2015)

13 weeks
Carlos Vives featuring Michel Teló — "Como Le Gusta A Tu Cuerpo" (2013)

11 weeks
Carlos Vives featuring ChocQuibTown — "El Mar de Sus Ojos" (2014)
Enrique Iglesias featuring Gente de Zona & Descemer Bueno — "Bailando" (2014–15)
Luis Fonsi featuring Daddy Yankee – "Despacito" (2017)

10 weeks
Carlos Vives — "Bailar Contigo" (2013)
Carlos Vives — "La Foto de los Dos" (2013–14)
Felipe Pelaez — "Vestirse de Amor (La Flor)" (2016)

Artist achievements

Most number one singles

References

External links
Official Site (In Spanish) (Weekly charts)
Genre Charts
 

Colombian record charts